Janno Jürisson (born 6 October 1980) is a former Estonian professional footballer who played as a midfielder.

References

External links

1980 births
Living people
Estonian footballers
Sportspeople from Viljandi
Viljandi JK Tulevik players
FC Flora players
FC Valga players
FC Elva players
FC Nõmme United players
Association football midfielders
Estonia youth international footballers
Estonia under-21 international footballers
Estonia international footballers
Meistriliiga players
Esiliiga players